Lachnocnema exiguus, the white woolly legs, is a butterfly in the family Lycaenidae. It is found in eastern Nigeria, Cameroon, Gabon, the Republic of the Congo, the north-eastern part of the Democratic Republic of the Congo, Uganda, and north-western Tanzania.

References

External links

Seitz, A. Die Gross-Schmetterlinge der Erde 13: Die Afrikanischen Tagfalter. Plate XIII 65 g

Butterflies described in 1890
Miletinae
Butterflies of Africa